Theodor Reichmann (15 March 1849 – 22 May 1903) was a German operatic baritone.

Life 
Born in Rostock, the son of a lawyer, Albert Reichmann began a commercial apprenticeship in Berlin at his parents' request, but soon devoted himself exclusively to his musical education. He took singing lessons with Johann Elssler, Eduard Mantius and Johann Reß. Reichmann made his debut at the Stadttheater Magdeburg as Ottokar in Carl Maria von Weber's Freischütz in 1869. After that, he had engagements in Rotterdam, Cologne and Strasbourg. From 1872 to 1875, he was at the Hamburgische Staatsoper, then at the National Theatre Munich until 1883.

In 1881 Reichmann made his debut at the Wiener Hofoper, whose ensemble he was a member of from 1883 to 1889 and from 1893 to 1903. From 1889 to 1891, he was engaged at the Krolloper and the Metropolitan Opera. From 1882 to 1902, he had regular appearances at the Bayreuth Festival. At the Bayreuth premiere cast of Parsifal in 1882 he sang the part of Amfortas.

In 1888 Reichmann was appointed Kammersänger. He was awarded the Order of Franz Joseph among others. In Vienna, the Reichmanngasse is named after him.

Already for a long time suffering from a heart condition, Reichmann died on 22 May 1903 - the 90th birthday of Richard Wagner – in Sanatorium Marbach in Bodensee following a stroke. Reichmann was buried in Berlin at the cemetery in front of the Hallesches Tor. In the preserved lattice tomb there is a multi-level funerary monument made of black granite, on which the marble sculpture of a mourner is leaning, created around 1904 in the stonemason workshop of Wilhelm Sipperling. A medallion with the portrait of the deceased has been lost.

Repertoire 

 Wilhelm Tell – Guillaume Tell
 Lord Ruthwen – Der Vampyr
 Hans Heiling – Hans Heiling
 Der Holländer – Der fliegende Holländer
 Wolfram – Tannhäuser
 Hans Sachs – Die Meistersinger von Nürnberg
 Wotan – Der Ring des Nibelungen
 Graf Luna – Der Troubadour
 Hamlet – Hamlet
 Werner Kirchhofer – Der Trompeter von Säckingen (by Victor Ernst Nessler)

Further reading 
 Ludwig Eisenberg: Großes biographisches Lexikon der Deutschen Bühne im XIX. Jahrhundert. Verlag von Paul List, Leipzig 1903, p 810 ff..
 Ludwig Eisenberg: Das geistige Wien. Künstler- und Schriftsteller-Lexikon. Mittheilungen über Wiener Architekten, Bildhauer, Bühnenkünstler, Graphiker, Journalisten, Maler, Musiker und Schriftsteller. Vol. 1. Wien, Daberkow, 1889 ff. 
 Christian Fastl: Theodor. In Oesterreichisches Musiklexikon. Online edition, Vienna 2002 ff., ; print edition: vol. 4, Publishing House of the Austrian Academy of Sciences, Vienna 2005, .

References

External links 
 
 Theodor Reichmann at the Wiener Staatsoper

German operatic baritones
1849 births
1903 deaths
People from Rostock
19th-century German male musicians